Albury Sports Ground (also known as "Albury Oval") is a sporting ground located close to the central business district of  Albury, Australia. The oval is near the NSW bank of the Murray River, with a historic grandstand on the north-western flank, and a members' club with a grandstand and changing rooms on the eastern wing. The venue also incorporates a netball court in the north-eastern corner, while the Albury Swim Centre is adjacent to the west. The ground is part of a string of parks and gardens between the Murray River and Wodonga Place that include the Albury Botanic Gardens, Hovell Tree Park, Noreuil Park, Australia Park, and Oddies Creek Park.

The venue is the home ground for the Albury Football Club in the Ovens & Murray Football League, and most seasons it hosts the Ovens & Murray preliminary final. In summers the venue is used for cricket, with a turf wicket, and in this capacity serves as the home of the Albury Tigers side in the Cricket Albury-Wodonga Provincial competition.

In May 2020, the Albury Sports Ground hosted the Melbourne Storm for a pre-season training capacity in preparation for recommencing the delayed 2020 NRL Season. The Storm were originally slated to train at Albury community Rugby League venue Greenfields Park, however a decision by the Albury City Council led to the Storm requiring an alternate venue at short notice.

History 
 1910: The Murray River broke its banks and flooded the park.
 It has a capacity of about 5,000, and historically had a capacity of at least 15,000.

2016 Proposed Redevelopment 
On 28 February 2014 the Border Mail published an article titled "Lavington Oval 'in the wrong spot' for major events" in which Andrew Boyd Barber (a University of Melbourne post-graduate urban design student) said: "Albury Council should start planning for an upgraded sportsground precinct." He went on to cite the AFL's decision to sell its ground at Waverley in favour of the Docklands stadium in central Melbourne. "Waverley is an incredible oval in the middle of suburbia that now has this radiating pattern of houses," ... "People couldn’t really access it that easily,". Mr Boyd Barber said Lavington Oval contained the same elements as Waverley, in that it had simply become nonviable to have a huge stadium in such a residential location. "You’ve got an oval on the outer fringe of an urban area that is slowly being encroached on by development,".

On 9 March 2016 the Border Mail published an article titled "Urban designer promotes plan to link new Albury aquatics centre with upgraded sportsground". ...

International & National usage

Australian Rules Football 
Round 8 of the 1952 VFL season was declared "National Day Round" where all matches were held away from traditional VFL venues, and as part of this, Albury Sports Ground hosted a fixture that saw South Melbourne 18.10 (118) defeat North Melbourne 14.12 (96).

Rugby League 
In May 2020, due to the COVID-19 lockdown in the state of Victoria, the Melbourne Storm utilised the training facilities in preparation for the resumption of their 2020 NRL season.

Other 
Whilst its role as Albury's main sporting venue has been superseded by the establishment of the Lavington Sports Ground in the 1970s, it has in the past hosted the O&MFL grand final (including the notorious 1990 "Bloodbath" decider between Lavington and Wodonga Bulldogs), as well as representative Australian Rules football and cricket matches. It was also the venue for the rugby league tour game in 1951 where a team of virtual unknowns representing Riverina upset France, who at the time were possibly the best test nation in the world. Riverina won 20–10, thank mostly to the boot of their fullback Koch, who kicked 7 goals. It has also hosted cultural events such as rock concerts and carols by candlelight, as well as hosting a stage of the Royal Tour by Queen Elizabeth II in 1988 during Australia's bicentenary of colonisation, where thousands of schoolchildren were assembled on the oval to greet the Queen.

References

Australian rules football grounds
Rugby league stadiums in Australia
Sport in Albury, New South Wales
Sports venues in New South Wales